Michal Amdursky (born in 1975) is an Israeli dancer and singer.

Biography
Michal Amdursky was married to Assaf Amdursky, with whom she has two children. She is one of the pioneers of the Israeli Dance Music genre. Amdurski began dancing at the age of 6 at the studio of the Bat-Dor Dance Company. At age 15, she moved to Budapest, where she studied Classical Dance at the Hungarian State Opera House. Later she returned to Israel to study at the Yoram Levinstein Acting Studio.

In 1999 Amdursky took part as a supporting actress in the TV drama "Deadly Fortune" (Kesef Katlani). The series was produced by Danny Kfir, publicized by Estee Shiraz, directed by Eran Riklis and was broadcast on prime time in Channels 2 and 3.

In 2000, Amdursky sang Luna in the pre-Eurovision song contest and came in third place. For several years, she served as a judge on the Israeli TV reality show "Nolad Lirkod" (Born to Dance).

The songs on her first album Notzetzim were written by Assaf Amdursky. Her second album "Let Her Sweat" combines dance and pop music.

Albums
 1998 Sparklers
 2000 Let Her Sweat
 2004 Michal Amdursky EP
 2009 Ishto Shel

References

External links
 Official website

1975 births
Living people
21st-century Israeli women singers
Israeli pop singers
Israeli female dancers
Date of birth missing (living people)
Place of birth missing (living people)
Israeli people of Romanian-Jewish descent